The 2010 Florida gubernatorial election took place on November 2, 2010. Republican-turned-Independent incumbent Governor Charlie Crist chose not to run for a second term. He instead ran (unsuccessfully) for the Senate seat vacated by Mel Martínez. This resulted in an open race for Governor of Florida in which Republican Rick Scott narrowly defeated Democrat Alex Sink.

Despite mixed to unfavorable ratings, Rick Scott benefited greatly from the midterm GOP wave in which Republicans made significant gains across the country. Scott was one of six Republican gubernatorial pick-ups nationwide (counting Crist as an Independent).

The tight and highly contentious election was one of the standout races in 2010. Despite not professing direct allegiance to the movement, Scott benefited from support and endorsement by Tea Party activists, an influential conservative voting bloc of the 2010 midterms. Furthermore, Scott ran aggressively against the Affordable Care Act (Obamacare), and exit polls indicated considerable support for that position.

Primary Elections

Democratic

Candidates
Alex Sink, CFO of Florida, teacher
Brian Moore, political activist, 2008 Socialist Party USA Nominee for President of the United States

Alex Sink, the CFO of Florida, was mentioned as a possible candidate to run for Senate or Governor in 2010, but initially declined. When Charlie Crist announced he would not run for re-election, Sink immediately announced her campaign for governor. Sink was the wife of Bill McBride, who ran unsuccessfully for governor in 2002.

Sink faced only token opposition in the primary. Her lone opponent was former Socialist Party presidential nominee Brian Moore. On primary day, Sink won the Democratic nomination with nearly 77% of the vote.

Republican
In May 2009, Republican incumbent governor Charlie Crist announced he would not run for re-election, and instead would run for U.S. Senate. The move immediately turned the race competitive, as GOP-hopefuls lined up to run for the open seat. Former congressman and Florida Attorney General Bill McCollum emerged as the early favorite. McCollum had previously lost the election for Senate in 2000, and lost the Republican nomination for Senate in 2004. This would be his third attempt at a major statewide campaign.

Just before the deadline, Rick Scott jumped into the primary fight. Scott started dumping millions of his own personal fortune into the race. The race quickly became one of the most expensive and "nasty" primary campaigns in recent Florida history. Scott and McCollum lashed out with very negative attacks against each other. Scott ran as a political "outsider", and led some early polls, but McCollum re-took the lead in polls just before primary day. Scott benefited in the absentee voting, while McCollum expected to make up the difference based on turnout. On primary day, Scott won the nomination with just over 46% of the vote. The dejected McCollum team reluctantly conceded after midnight.

General Election

Candidates

Republican
Bill McCollum, Florida Attorney General and former U.S. Representative
Rick Scott, health care executive, businessman, and healthcare activist
Mike McCalister, businessman

Democratic
Alex Sink, Chief Financial Officer
Brian P. Moore, marketing and executive director, project administrator and consultant, 2008 Socialist Party presidential nominee

Independence Party of Florida
Peter L. Allen, electrical inspector

No party affiliation
Michael E. Arth, policy analyst and urban designer who entered the race as a Democrat in June 2009 and later switched to no party affiliation in June 2010
Farid Khavari, economist, author, and small business owner
Daniel Imperato
Calvin Clarence "C.C." Reed
The race was dominated by the two major party candidates and spending on their behalf. By the October 25, 2010, Tampa debate between Scott and Sink, Scott had spent $60 million of his own money on the campaign compared to Sink's $28 million. Total campaign expenditure for the race exceeded $100 million, far exceeding any previous spending for a governor's race in Florida.  Scott spent $78 million of his personal wealth in the race. Sink made an issue of Scott's connections to Columbia/HCA, a Medicare billing fraud scandal.

One of the turning points in the campaign came during the debate. During a commercial break, Sink's make-up artist delivered a text message on her cell phone to Sink, in direct violation of the debate rules. The rules infraction was immediately pointed out by Scott and the debate moderators. Sink's team was accused of cheating during the debate, and the aide who delivered the message was fired from the campaign the next morning. Afterwards, media and observers were very critical of the gaffe.

Predictions

Polling

Democratic primary

Republican primary

General election

Hypothetical Polls

Results
The 2010 governor's race was one of Florida's closest, decided by just over 60,000 votes. Unlike the concurrent Senate race, the governor's race remained in doubt late into the night. When polls closed, Scott had a lead, but as the night progressed, the margin narrowed. The next day, with over 99% of precincts reporting, Scott maintained about a 1% lead in the raw vote. Despite a small number of still-uncounted ballots from Palm Beach County, Sink's chances of winning were negligible, as Scott was still ahead by over 50,000 – much more than the 3,000 uncounted ballots, and more importantly, still above the threshold of 0.5% to trigger a mandatory recount. Sink conceded on Wednesday.

Exit polls showed that Scott won among independents and the two candidates split the Hispanic vote.

See also
 List of governors of Florida
 2010 United States gubernatorial elections

References

External links
Florida Division of Elections
Florida Governor Candidates at Project Vote Smart
Campaign contributions for 2010 Florida Governor from Follow the Money
2010 Florida Gubernatorial General Election: All Head-to-Head Matchups graph of multiple polls from Pollster.com
Election 2010: Florida Governor from Rasmussen Reports
2010 Florida Governor – McCollum vs. Sink from Real Clear Politics
2010 Florida Governor's Race from CQ Politics
Race Profile in The New York Times
Official campaign websites (Archived)
Peter Allen for Governor
Michael E. Arth for Governor
Farid Khavari for Governor
Rick Scott for Governor
Alex Sink for Governor

2010
Florida
Gubernatorial